Alberta Provincial Highway No. 663 is a highway in the province of Alberta, Canada. It runs west-east from Highway 44 near Fawcett, runs concurrent with Highway 2 and Highway 63 to Boyle. Then to a concurrency with Highway 55 (Northern Woods and Water Route) in Lac La Biche before extending north around Lakeland Provincial Park to Torchwood Lake. It is also known as Taylor Road in Boyle, and 88 Avenue in Lac La Biche.

History 
In the 1940s the roads that become Secondary Highways were only dirt trails. Farmers would have to use axes to clear the brush of the boreal forest from the road allowance, and use plows and machinery pulled by horses to maintain the roads and fill in low spots that filled with water during spring melt and summer rains.  These were not all weather roads, there were no snow ploughs to keep the roads clear over the winter months, so in the 1950s the larger farm trucks could only make it through a few months of the year. By 1957, the road saw an application of gravel to the surface, and was graded. A formal surveying crew came through in 1963 to clear brush and mark the path of the highway which was constructed in 1964.

Major intersections 
Starting from the west end of Highway 663:

References 

663